The Rev. Dr. Larry D. Pickens is a graduate of North Park University and holds a master of theology degree and master of divinity degree from Garrett-Evangelical Theological Seminary, a doctorate in ministry from Chicago Theological Seminary, and a Juris Doctor from DePaul University College of Law. Larry is the executive director of the Pennsylvania Council of Churches. Larry is the former general secretary of the General Commission on Christian Unity and Interreligious Concerns of the United Methodist Church. During his tenure as the ecumenical staff officer these significant events took place. Pickens served as the Ecumenical Director of The Lehigh Conference of Churches in Allentown, Pennsylvania from 2014-20.

Larry has engaged in and developed numerous ecumenical and interfaith events:

 Organized and Moderated a major United Methodist Consultation on the Global Nature of the Church, This was a forum designed to help the United Methodist Church address global and ecumenical issues in Africa, The United States, Europe, the Philippines and Latin America Norcross, Georgia
 Organized and led a United Methodist Delegation to the Vatican and the Pontifical Council for Promoting Christian Unity
 Organized and led a United Methodist Delegation to Havana, Cuba for an Ecumenical Visit. This including an effort to mediate an existing dispute between the Methodist Church in Cuba and the Presbyterian Church regarding the status of the Theological School at Matanzas. This was also an opportunity for us to meet with ecumenical representatives from Cuba an address issues facing the United States and
 Organized Training Event for United Methodists attending the 9th Assembly of the World Council of Council of Churches, Chicago, Illinois- This was a training opportunity designed to prepare United Methodist delegates for the intricacies of the Assembly process. It was also an overview of the issues that we would encounter at the Assembly.
 Led the agency through a process of strategic planning as we charted a course for the ecumenical and interfaith ministry of the United Methodist Church. This process involved an environmental scan and mapping for the future ecumenical agenda of the United Methodist Church. Our aim was to project the direction of the agency as we looked forward 5–10 years.
 Created the Bridge Builder Award in honor of the late Bishop James K Mathews. The first award was given to President Ellen Johnson Sirleaf at the 2008 General Conference in Ft. Worth, Texas

Pickens' extensive ecumenical and connectional involvement has included:

                                        Connectional and ecumenical church experiences:

Delegate (First Alternate) to The General Conference of The United Methodist Church, Fort Worth, Texas- 2008            
Delegate to The Jurisdictional Conference of The United Methodist Church, Grand Rapids, Michigan- 2008
Board Member of Oikocredit- 2007
Participant in Ecumenical Peace Conference, Savu Savu, Fiji- 2007
Organized and Moderated a Major Consultation on the Global Nature of the Church, Norcross, Georgia- 2007
World Council of Churches, United Methodist Representative to the Joint Consultative Commission- 2007–Present  
World Council of Churches, Participant in Consultation on the Ecumenical Movement in the 21st Century in Geneva, Switzerland- 2006 
Member of the Executive Committee of the World Council of Churches- 2006–Present 
Member of the Central Committee of the World Council of Churches- 2006–Present  
Delegate to the World Methodist Conference, Seoul, Korea- 2006  
Organized and led a United Methodist Delegation to the Vatican and the Pontifical Council for Promoting Christian Unity- 2006
Organized and led a United Methodist Delegation to Havana, Cuba for an Ecumenical Visit- 2006
Organized Training Event for United Methodists Attending the 9th Assembly of the World Council of Churches, Chicago, Illinois- 2005
Delegate to the Assembly on World Mission and Evangelism, Athens, Greece 2005  
Coordinating Council Member of Churches Uniting in Christ- 2005-2007 
World Council of Churches, Delegate to the 9th Assembly in Porto Alegre, Brazil- 2005  
World Council of Churches, Participant in the Ecumenical Officers Forum- 2004-2006  
National Council of Churches of Christ of the USA, Delegate General Assembly- 2004-2007
National Council of Churches of Christ of the USA, Governing Board Member- 2004-2007  
The Committee to Study the Relationship between the United Methodist Church and the Affiliated Autonomous Churches of Latin America and the Caribbean- 2004-2008  
The Connectional Table- United Methodist Church- 2004-2008  
The Judicial Council- United Methodist Church- 2000-2004  
Delegate to the General Conference of The United Methodist Church, Cleveland, Ohio- 2000  
Delegate to the Jurisdictional Conference of The United Methodist Church, Madison, Wisconsin- 2000  
Northern Illinois Committee on Investigation- 1996-1999         
People to People, Delegate to International Human Rights Conference, Havana, Cuba- 1998  
Delegate to the People to People Seminar on the Legal System of South Africa- 1997  
Delegate to the World Methodist Conference, Singapore- 1991  
Delegate to the Seventh Assembly of the World Council of Churches, Canberra, Australia- 1991
Delegate to the Assembly on World Mission and Evangelism, San Antonio- 1987    
Northern Illinois Board of Ordained Ministry- 1988-1993  
National Black Methodists for Church Renewal- 1986–Present  
Delegate to the World Methodist Conference, Nairobi, Kenya- 1985,

Community Service:  
The Human Relations Board-The City of Elgin, Illinois- 2001-2004 
Marcy Newberry Association, Board of Directors- 1988-1993 
Community Block Grant Advisory Board-The City of Chicago, Illinois-1988-1995

Other pastoral roles have included service at:

Southlawn United Methodist Church, Chicago, IL
Memorial United Methodist Church, White Plains, NY
Northbrook United Methodist Church, Northbrook Illinois, Senior Pastor 
General Commission on Christian Unity and Interreligious Concerns, New York, New York, General Secretary
 First United Methodist Church, Elgin, Illinois, Senior Pastor  
 Maple Park United Methodist Church, Chicago, Illinois, Senior Pastor  
 United States Trustee, Chicago, Illinois, Extern 
 Gorham United Methodist Church, Chicago, Illinois, Senior Pastor  
 St. Mark United Methodist Church, Chicago, Illinois, Associate Pastor

Pickens and his wife, Debra, have a daughter, Jessica.

References
https://web.archive.org/web/20110607055102/http://www.umc.org/site/apps/nlnet/content3.aspx?c=lwL4KnN1LtH&b=2072519&ct=5161661
http://www.wfn.org/2004/03/msg00180.html

Living people
DePaul University College of Law alumni
Chicago Theological Seminary alumni
Year of birth missing (living people)